Nakasero Market is a market in Kampala, Uganda, located at the foot of Nakasero hill. It sells fresh food, textiles, shoes and cheap electronics. Nakasero market  is located 50 meters off the Entebbe Road.It is one of the biggest markets in Kampala city central business District

History
Nakasero Market started in 1895 where it was first established in the Lubiri (Palace). In 1905, Nakasero Market was moved to Kagugube which was initially a temporary structure. In 1927, the market was established in the middle of Kampala, and it is the oldest in the capital. The market employs over 10,000 people from across Uganda and the wider region of East Africa. These  include diverse community of vendors, traders, service providers and hawkers acting as a source of income to a rapidly growing urban population most of whom lack access to formal employment.

Structure
Nakasero Market is divided up into two areas; The open area which is partially covered and the closed area which is in an old building. In the open area, fresh produce is mainly sold and in the closed area one would find hardware, clothes and tourist items on sale.

Ownership
Nakasero Market is managed by Nakasero Market Vendors and Traders Association, Ltd.

Products sold in Nakasero Market
Fruits
Vegetables
Meat
poultry
Textile
Electronics
Matooke
Eggs
Coffee
Spices

References

Economy of Kampala
Kumusha